Tachypodoiulus is a genus of millipedes within the family Julidae, which contains two species.

Species
 Tachypodoiulus albipes (Koch, C. L., 1838)
 Tachypodoiulus niger (Leach, 1814)

References

Millipede genera
Julida